Boulad may refer to:
Henri Boulad (born 1931), Egyptian Melkite, Jesuit priest and author
Marcel Boulad (1905–1977), Egyptian fencer